William Lloyd Francis (born 1 October 1947) is an English-born former professional rugby league footballer who played in the 1960s, 1970s and 1980s.

Background
Francis was born in Featherstone, West Riding of Yorkshire, England, he has Welsh ancestors, and eligible to play for Wales due to the grandparent rule.

Playing career

International honours
Bill Francis won caps for Wales while at Wigan in 1975 against France, England, in the 1975 Rugby League World Cup against France, England, Australia, New Zealand, England, Australia, New Zealand, and France, in 1977 against England, and France, while at St. Helens in 1978 against France, England, and Australia, in 1979 against France, and England, while at Oldham in 1980 against France, and England, and won caps for Great Britain while at Wigan in 1967 against Australia, and in the 1977 Rugby League World Cup against New Zealand, Australia (2 matches).

Jointly with John Mantle, he coached Wales for one game in the 60-13 defeat by England on 28 May 1978 at Knowsley Road, St Helens; both Francis & Mantle played that day

County league appearances
Bill Francis played in Wigan's victory in the Lancashire County League during the 1969–70 season.

County Cup Final appearances
Bill Francis played right-, i.e. number 3, and scored a try in Wigan's 15-8 victory over Widnes in the 1971–72 Lancashire County Cup Final during the 1971–72 season at Knowsley Road, St. Helens on Saturday 28 August 1971, and played  in the 19-9 victory over Salford in the 1973–74 Lancashire County Cup Final during the 1973–74 season at Wilderspool Stadium, Warrington, on Saturday 13 October 1973.

BBC2 Floodlit Trophy Final appearances
Bill Francis played , i.e. number 2, in Wigan's 7-4 victory over St. Helens in the 1968 BBC2 Floodlit Trophy Final during the 1968–69 season at Central Park, Wigan on Tuesday 17 December 1968, played right-, i.e. number 3, and scored 2-conversion in the 6-11 defeat by Leigh in the 1969 BBC2 Floodlit Trophy Final during the 1969–70 season at Central Park, Wigan on Tuesday 16 December 1969, played  in St. Helens' 11-26 defeat by Hull Kingston Rovers in the 1977 BBC2 Floodlit Trophy Final during the 1977–78 season at Craven Park, Kingston upon Hull on Tuesday 13 December 1977, and played  in the 7-13 defeat by Widnes in the 1978 BBC2 Floodlit Trophy Final during the 1978–79 season at Knowsley Road, St. Helens on Tuesday 12 December 1978.

Club career
Bill Francis made his début for Wigan in the 12-0 victory over Liverpool City in the Western Division Championship at Central Park, Wigan on Thursday 28 March 1963, he scored his first try for Wigan in the 17-5 victory over Warrington at Central Park, Wigan on Monday 2 January 1967, he was the top try-scorer with 40-tries in the Championship during the 1968–69 season, he played left-, i.e. number 4, and was sent-off for fighting with Gary Hetherington (left-, i.e. number 11) in the 78th Minute in Wigan's 7-8 defeat by York in the 1976–77 Players No.6 Trophy second round during the 1976–77 season at Clarence Street, York on Sunday 7 November 1976, he scored his last try for Wigan in the 52-8 victory over Whitehaven at Central Park, Wigan on Sunday 28 August 1977, and he played his last match for Wigan in the 13-18 defeat by Bradford Northern at Odsal Stadium, Bradford on Sunday 9 October 1977.

References

External links
!Great Britain Statistics at englandrl.co.uk (statistics currently missing due to not having appeared for both Great Britain, and England)
Statistics at wigan.rlfans.com
Statistics at orl-heritagetrust.org.uk
Profile at saints.org.uk
The Ones That Got Away
Wales 1975 Team - Seven of these players played for Salford at some stage
Bill Francis - Salford v Swinton 1981
Packing down against Bradford in the 17-13 Challenge Cup win February 1981
Bill Francis - Salford RLFC 1981

1947 births
Living people
English people of Welsh descent
English rugby league coaches
English rugby league players
Great Britain national rugby league team players
Oldham R.L.F.C. coaches
Oldham R.L.F.C. players
Rugby league centres
Rugby league five-eighths
Rugby league fullbacks
Rugby league players from Featherstone
Rugby league wingers
Salford Red Devils players
St Helens R.F.C. players
Wales national rugby league team captains
Wales national rugby league team coaches
Wales national rugby league team players
Wigan Warriors players
Yorkshire rugby league team players